Paysage d'Hiver is an ambient black metal project from Burgdorf, Canton of Berne, Switzerland. Formed in 1997, the sole member is Wintherr—an alias of Tobias Möckl—who is also the frontman of Darkspace as Wroth. Paysage d'Hiver is a French term, meaning "Landscape of Winter"; indeed, its lyrical content addresses primarily winter, darkness, and astral projection, although the vast majority of the lyrics along with release and track titles are in German or Swiss German with only two French pieces. Wintherr has cited the Burzum albums Hvis lyset tar oss and Filosofem, among others, as an inspiration for his music. All of Paysage d'Hiver's own material is released through Kunsthall Produktionen, a label Wintherr runs together with his wife (although Nimosh of the one-man project Nordlicht had also been previously involved).

As described on the Kunsthall website, all of the project's releases are connected in that they tell different pieces of a story describing a lone wanderer's experiences through a realm known as "Paysage d'Hiver", from which the project takes its name; the cover art of each work—which, contrary to those of Darkspace, is typically more landscape-oriented and atmospheric than minimalistic and abstract—appears to reflect its respective chapter in the wanderer's journey.

Musical style 
Paysage d'Hiver's music is known for its extremely lo-fi, raw production style, while musically it tends to alternate between (and even merge) ambient black metal and pure ambient music—at times also incorporating elements of funeral doom metal, dungeon synth, drone and sound collage, particularly in its earlier outputs.

Wintherr plays every instrument, and tends to alternate between acoustic and programmed drums based on what he believes best suits the work at hand. The production style is also a deliberate artistic decision by Wintherr as "the atmosphere is the most important aspect. So the sound is more of an artistic approach than anything else. This kind of sound really opens me up to the possibilities of the imagination than clear sounding instruments would."

Discography 
All of Paysage d'Hiver's releases prior to the 2020 album, Im Wald, are classified by the band as demos. All releases after the Steineiche CD-R were originally exclusively released on cassette and limited to 200 copies each, but were later re-released on CD in unlimited quantities. Schattengang, Die Festung and Paysage d'Hiver have also been released on vinyl, each limited to 300 copies. On the highly limited nature of the cassette and vinyl releases, Wintherr stated he considers them to be "collector's items" whereas the CD versions are to facilitate wider audiences' access to the music.

Studio albums 
 Im Wald (2020)
 Geister (2021)

Demos 
 Steineiche (1998)
 Schattengang (1998)
 Die Festung (1998)
 Kerker (1999)
 Paysage d'Hiver (1999)
 Kristall & Isa (2000)
 Winterkälte (2001)
 Nacht (2004)
 Einsamkeit (2007)
 Das Tor (2013)

EPs 
 Im Traum (2020)

Singles 
 "Schnee (IV)" (2017)
 "Das Gletschertor" (2020), originally released in 2002
 "Das schwarze Metall-Eisen" (2020), originally released in 1998
 "Schwarzä Feus & Schwarzäs Isä" (2020), originally released in 2004 as separate tracks
 "Im Winterwald" (2020)
 "Bluet" (2021)
 "Äschä" (2021)
 "Schtampfä" (2021)

Splits 
 Schnee / Das Winterreich (2003), split with Vinterriket
 Paysage d'Hiver / Lunar Aurora (2004), split with Lunar Aurora
 Десь блукає журба (Somewhere Sadness Wanders) / Schnee (IV) (2017), split with Drudkh
 Paysage d'Hiver / Nordlicht (2017), split with Nordlicht

Compilations 
 Das Gletschertor / Das schwarze Metall-Eisen (2020)
 Schnee (2020)

Compilation appearances 
 "Schnee" on Wurzelgeister (Ketzer Records, 2002)
 "Gletschertor" on D.S.T. – Deutsche Schwarze Tonträgerkunst (Westwall Produktion, 2002)
 "Gletschertor" (tonally improved version) on Schneesturm (Black Metal Mafia, 2003)

Personnel 
 Wintherr – vocals, guitars, bass, keyboards, drums, drum programming, violin, samples (since 1997)

References

External links 
 Official Myspace
 Paysage d'Hiver on Encyclopedia Metallum
 Kunsthall Produktionen

Swiss black metal musical groups
Musical groups established in 1997
One-man bands